Arif Gürdenlı (born 7 September 1966) is a Turkish sailor. He competed in the Finn event at the 1992 Summer Olympics.

References

External links
 

1966 births
Living people
Turkish male sailors (sport)
Olympic sailors of Turkey
Sailors at the 1992 Summer Olympics – Finn
Place of birth missing (living people)